Sean Lance Tucker (born October 25, 2001) is an American football running back for the Syracuse Orange.

High school
Tucker was born on October 25, 2001, in Owings Mills, Maryland. He attended Calvert Hall in Towson, Maryland, where he played football and also ran track. Considered one of the top running back prospects in Maryland by ESPN (#14), 247Sports (#27, rated three-star) and Rivals (#27), Tucker was recruited by Syracuse assistant coach Reno Ferri.

College career

2020
As a freshman in 2020, Tucker was named Syracuse's starting running back four games into the season following a rash of injuries and opt-outs due to COVID-19 pandemic. He ran for the third-most yards (626 yards) and the second-most yards per game (69.9) in a single season by an Syracuse Orange freshman ever. He was named the Atlantic Coast Conference Running Back of the Week twice and led all freshmen running backs in the ACC in rushing yards per game.

2021
During the breakout 2021 season, Tucker totaled 1,496 rushing yards during the 2021 regular season, fourth best among all Division I FBS players. He became the first player in program history to rush for over 1,000 yards in eight games or less and set the program record for most 100-yard games in a season (8) and most consecutive 100 yards games at 7. He broke Joe Morris's 42-year record for Syracuse's most single-season rushing yards in game against NC State. In addition to breaking this record set in 1979, Tucker also overtook Syracuse greats such as Floyd Little, Walter Reyes, and Larry Csonka. In the game against Albany, Tucker had a combined 253 yards (132 rushing, 121 receiving) and five touchdowns, becaming the first player in program history to have both 100+ rushing yards and 100+ receiving yards. Tucker surpassed 1,000-yard mark in win over Virginia Tech. Against Boston College, he amassed a career-high 207 rushing yards.

Tucker was named to the Associated Press midseason All-America first team. ESPN college football analyst Trevor Matich named Tucker one of four candidates for the Heisman Trophy. He was the semifinalists for the Doak Walker Award as well as the Maxwell Award. Tucker was named the ACC Running Back of the Week multiple times.

Tucker was named to first-team All-ACC, first-team All-American by Football Writers Association of America, ESPN and second-team All-American by the Associated Press, Walter Camp Football Foundation, and American Football Coaches Association.

Statistics

References

External links
 Syracuse Orange bio

2001 births
Living people
American football running backs
People from Owings Mills, Maryland
Sportspeople from Baltimore County, Maryland
Players of American football from Maryland
Syracuse Orange football players
All-American college football players